Abalobadiah Creek is a stream with its mouth on the coast about a mile above the mouth of Ten Mile River on the Pacific Ocean coast of Mendocino County, California.

Variant names
According to the Geographic Names Information System, it has also been known historically as:
Lobadiah Gulch

References

Rivers of Mendocino County, California
Rivers of Northern California